General elections were held in Puerto Rico on 8 November 1960. Luis Muñoz Marín of the Popular Democratic Party was re-elected as governor, whilst the PPD also won a majority of the vote in the House of Representatives elections. Voter turnout was 84.6%.

Results

Governor

House of Representatives

References

1960 elections in the Caribbean
1960
Elections
Puerto Rico